= Amrutha Sinchana Spiritual University =

Amruta Sinchana Spiritual University
- Type: Private
- Established: Proposed in 2013
- Location: Bangalore, Karnataka, India

Amruta Sinchana Spiritual University is a proposed Private University in Bangalore, Karnataka State of India..

== Present Status ==
The MoU for this university project was signed during Karnataka Global Investor's Meet (GIM), 2012 in June 2012 with a proposed investment promise of approximate INR 1000 Crores (Approx: USD 190 Million).

== Promoters ==
The university is promoted by a Bangalore-based, Harsha Kriya Foundation (R) Trust.
